Duke Yi of Lu was a ruler of the state of Lu during the Western Zhou Dynasty, succeeding his father Duke Wu as the tenth ruler of Lu. His ancestral name was Ji, and given name Xi.

Despite being the younger son of Duke Wu, he was made heir apparent over his older brother Kuo by the intervention of King Xuan of Zhou. After nine years of rule, supporters of Kuo and of his son Boyu rose in revolt and murdered Duke Yi; Boyu was then proclaimed to be the Duke of Lu by the rebels.

References

Monarchs of Lu (state)
9th-century BC Chinese monarchs
807 BC deaths